Black Field may refer to:
 Black Field (2009 Canadian film), a Canadian historical drama film
 Black Field (2009 Greek film), a Greek film directed by Vardis Marinakis

See also
  Blackfield (disambiguation)